The following Union Army units and commanders fought in the Appomattox campaign of the American Civil War. Order of battle compiled from the army organization during the campaign. The Confederate order of battle is shown separately.

Abbreviations used

Military rank
 LTG = Lieutenant General
 MG = Major General
 BG = Brigadier General
 Col = Colonel
 Ltc = Lieutenant Colonel
 Maj = Major
 Cpt = Captain
 Lt = Lieutenant

Other
 w = wounded
 mw = mortally wounded
 k = killed in action

Union forces
LTG Ulysses S. Grant, Commanding

Staff:
 Assistant adjutant general: BG Seth Williams

Escort:
 5th U.S. Cavalry, Companies B, F, and K: Cpt Julius W. Mason

Headquarters Guard:
 4th U.S. Infantry: Cpt Joseph B. Collins

Army of the Potomac

MG George G.Meade

II Corps

MG Andrew A. Humphreys

V Corps

MG Gouverneur K. Warren

Bvt MG Charles Griffin
 
Escort
 4th Pennsylvania Cavalry, Company C: Cpt Napoleon J. Horrell
Provost Guard
 104th New York: Cpt William W. Graham

VI Corps

MG Horatio G. Wright
 
Escort
 21st Pennsylvania Cavalry, Company E: Cpt William H. Royd, jr.

IX Corps

MG John G. Parke
 
Provost Guard
 79th New York: Maj Andrew D. Baird

Cavalry

Army of the James

MG Edward O. C. Ord

Chief of Staff: Bvt BG Theodore Read (mw, April 6)

Defenses of Bermuda Hundred
MG George L. Hartsuff

XXIV Corps

MG John Gibbon
 
Headquarters Guard

Cpt Charles E. Thomas
 4th Massachusetts Cavalry, Company F: Cpt Joseph J. Baker
 4th Massachusetts Cavalry, Company K: Cpt Charles E. Thomas

XXV Corps

MG Godfrey Weitzel
 
Provost Guard
 4th Massachusetts Cavalry, Companies E & H: Maj Atherton H. Stevens, Jr.

Cavalry

Army of the Shenandoah

MG Philip H. Sheridan

Chief of staff: Col James Forsyth

Cavalry Corps
MG Wesley Merritt

Notes

References
U.S. War Department, The War of the Rebellion: a Compilation of the Official Records of the Union and Confederate Armies, U.S. Government Printing Office, 1880–1901.
National Park Service: Appomattox Court House (Union order of battle).
 Calkins, Chris. The Appomattox Campaign: March 29 – April 9, 1865. Conshohocken, Pennsylvania: Combined Books, 1997. .

American Civil War orders of battle
Union order of battle